Imperial Valley Transit (IVT), also known as IV Transit, is the provider of mass transportation in California's Imperial Valley, serving the cities of El Centro, Calexico, Brawley, and Imperial. Formed in 1989 with just 3 buses and serving close to 3000 passengers per month, the agency currently serves more than 73,000 passengers per month with over 20 buses in operation. Twelve routes, plus the El Centro Circulators (which are labeled as the Green Line running clockwise and the Blue Line running counterclockwise) form the structure of the system. Service is provided every day of the week except on recognized federal holidays. Two limited stop routes (the 31/32 Direct) also travel Monday-Saturday, and two express buses (the 21 & 22 IVC Express) run to Imperial Valley College when classes are in session.

Recent Developments
Imperial Valley Transit has been on a concentrated effort in recent years to improve transit services to the region it serves. These efforts include replacing an aging fleet from the 1990s with new vehicles. New transit stations have also been developed with more on the way planned for the cities of Calexico and Imperial. Schedules for the most in-demand routes have been expanded as well, alleviating overcrowding.

Partnership with YCIPTA and the Quechan Indian Tribe
The following routes are treated as an extension of the Imperial Valley Transit system, funded and administered by the Imperial County Transportation Commission (ICTC), Yuma County Intergovernmental Public Transportation Authority, and Quechan. The routes are operated with Yuma County Area Transit (YCAT) buses.

YCAT Turquoise Route 10

Since its formation in 1989, IV Transit had provided public transportation to Winterhaven with an extension of Route 3 east of Holtville. This lifeline route, composed of one round trip, provided passengers in the remote community access to government and medical services in the county seat of El Centro every Wednesday.

When ICTC, administrator and funder of IV Transit, was approached by Quechan and YCIPTA to provide better transit services in the area, all agencies agreed to discontinue the extension of Route 3 east of Holtville and replace it with the newly jointly funded YCAT Turquoise Route 10. The more extensive route, effective January 7, 2013, provided two round trips a day and traveled every Monday, Wednesday, and Saturday. The route better serves Eastern Imperial County residents and connects Yuma, Winterhaven, and El Centro via Interstate 8. Further connections are available to YCAT routes at the Downtown Yuma Transit Center and IVT routes at the El Centro Regional Transit Terminal.

Though showing modest gains in ridership since then, service on Saturdays has been cut effective July 1, 2016 due to its inability to meet farebox recovery ratio performance standards. Additionally, discounts and fare passes were terminated for YCAT's Turquoise Route 10 in order to increase its chances of meeting the aforementioned standard.

As of June 30, 2017, Turquoise Route 10 achieved its standard and added a third day to its schedule effective July 1, 2018 with the addition of Fridays.

YCAT Blue Route 5

This partnership was further broaden when ICTC started to jointly fund with YCIPTA and Quechan YCAT's Blue Route 5 in FY 2016. The route, which has been around since June 1, 2012, is a circulator running in a counter clockwise direction connecting Yuma with the Fort Yuma Indian Reservation, Winterhaven, and the Quechan Casino Resort. The service further enhances the transportation options Eastern Imperial County residents have at their disposal.

And since October 20, 2013, Blue Route 5 now makes a stop at the Andrade Port of Entry. This is the first time public transit services have ever stop at this destination.

Schedule Expansion

Part of this expansion included an increase in Saturday service beginning August 3, 2013. Buses would now run approximately every 90 minutes on Routes 1 & 2.

Trips to and from Imperial Valley College have also improved in August 2013 from an initial 7 to 11 trips a day on Route 21. Again, this alleviated overcrowding and allowed students to arrive to classes on time.

Further expansion was achieved with headway improvements from 70 to 35 minutes beginning October 1, 2013 on Route 1 during peak hours from 7 a.m. thru 5:30 p.m. The immediate results were buses running on time and less passengers being left behind at bus stops.

On December 18, 2013, the Brawley Gold Line circulator was established in the city of Brawley to better serve its residents and transferring passengers on the main bus routes of the system. It serves key destinations, providing greater mobility around the city.

Additional circulators are planned when funding becomes available with the Garnet Line in Calexico and the Red Line in Imperial.

Starting January 5, 2014, limited Sunday service was implemented between Calexico and Brawley on Routes 1 & 2 along with IVT Access, the local para transit service of Imperial Valley. This is the first time public transportation services has been provided county-wide on Sundays.

Transit Technology

In 2016, Wi-Fi has also been introduced to the entire fleet of vehicles except for the circulator routes (Blue, Gold, and Green Lines) in Brawley and El Centro. Also, most if not all vehicles have security cameras.

Routes
 1N/1S: Calexico-El Centro  
 2N/2S: El Centro-Niland 
 3W/3E: El Centro-Holtville 
 4W/4E: El Centro-Seeley-**Ocotillo** 
 21N/21S IVC Express: Imperial Valley College to Calexico 
 22N/22S IVC Express: Imperial Valley College to Niland 
 31 Direct: Brawley-Calexico 
 32 Direct: Calexico-Brawley 
 41N/41S: Brawley Fast
 45W/45E: Holtville Fast
 51N/51S: Brawley-Bombay Beach-Slab City
 Brawley Gold Line
 El Centro Blue Line
 El Centro Green Line
**On demand response Tuesdays only.

Roster

References

External links
 Official Imperial Valley Transit−IVT website
 IVT Access
 IVT Ride
 IVT MedTrans
 Imperial County Transportation Commission (ICTC)
 YCAT/YCIPTA
 Fort Yuma Quechan Indian Tribe

Public transportation in Imperial County, California
Imperial Valley
El Centro metropolitan area
Bus transportation in California
Brawley, California
Calexico, California
El Centro, California